Recques is part of the name of 2 communes in the Pas-de-Calais department of France:

 Recques-sur-Course
 Recques-sur-Hem